The 27th Torino Film Festival was held 13 November – 21 November 2009 in Turin, Italy and was directed by Gianni Amelio, in his first year as director of the festival.

Films in competition
Chi L'Ha Visto (Claudia Rorarius)
Children Metal Divers (Ralston Jover)
Crackie (Sherry White)
Get Low (Aaron Schneider)
Guy and Madeline on a Park Bench (Damien Chazelle)
Jalainur (Zhao Ye)
The King of Escape (Alain Guiraudie)
The Maid (Sebastián Silva)
Medal of Honor (Călin Peter Netzer)
The Mouth of the Wolf (Pietro Marcello)
North (Rune Denstad Langlo)
Santina (Gioberto Pignatelli)
Torso (Yutaka Yamazaki)
Transmission (Roland Vranik)
Van Diemen's Land (Jonathan auf der Heide)
You Won't Miss Me (Ry Russo-Young)

Awards
Prize of the City of Torino:
The Mouth of the Wolf (Pietro Marcello)
Jury Special Prize:
Crackie (Sherry White)
Special Mention:
Victor Rebengiuc (Medal of Honor)
Best Female Performance:
Catalina Saavedra (The Maid)
Cipputi Award:
Children Metal Divers (Ralston Jover)
Holden Award for the Best Script:
Călin Peter Netzer (Medal of Honor)
Audience Award:
Medal of Honor (Călin Peter Netzer)
FIPRESCI Prize:
The Mouth of the Wolf (Pietro Marcello)

References

External links

2009 Torino Film Festival at the Internet Movie Database

Torino
Torino
Torino
Torino Film Festival